WHTI is a radio station licensed to Salem, West Virginia, serving the Clarksburg/Fairmont area. WHTI is owned and operated by Burbach Broadcasting Co.

The station (as WOBG-FM) previously broadcast an active rock format. On January 22, 2018, the station changed its call letters to WHTI, and began stunting with the sound of crickets. On January 25, 2018 WHTI launched a top 40 (CHR) format, branded as "Hot 105.7".

References

External links
Hot 105.7 Online

HTI
Radio stations established in 1991
1991 establishments in West Virginia
Contemporary hit radio stations in the United States